Claviceps pusilla, also known as bluestem ergot, is a parasitic fungus primarily of the grass tribe Angropogoneae, particularly those in the tribe referred to as "bluestem". C. pusilla occasionally manifests characteristic triangular conidia which appear to be unique among Claviceps species.

Range 
Claviceps pusilla has been documented in Australia, and in the USA in the states of Texas, New Mexico, Oklahoma, and Iowa.

The earliest record found for C. pusilla was by Pammel and Weems in 1900. Scientists have identified C. pusilla on Andropogon species based on examination of ascomata from germinated sclerotia. Examination of a collection from Texas revealed yellow capitula characteristic of C. pusilla. However, in certain collections labeled as C. pusilla, triangular conidia characteristic of this species were not present. Additional collections need to be examined to confirm the presence of C. pusilla in the United States. C. pusilla has a wide geographical distribution, is known from Andropogon spp., and likely occurs on Andropogon spp. in the United States. However, we consider reports of C. purpurea var. purpurea on Andropogon spp. to be incorrect.

Ecology 
Claviceps pusilla infects the inflorescence of certain grasses by replacing caryopses with fungal sclerotia.

List of published host species:

 Andropogon gerardii Vitman = Andropogon furcatus Muhl. in Wild.
 Andropogon hallii Hack.
 Andropogon spp.
 Arundinella nepalensis
 Bothriochloa biloba
 Bothriochloa bladhii
 Bothriochloa decipiens
 Bothriochloa erianthoides
 Bothriochloa ewartiana
 Bothriochloa glabra
 Bothriochloa insculpta
 Bothriochloa ischaemum (L.) Keng = Andropogon ischaemum L.
 Bothriochloa macra
 Bothriochloa pertusa
 Capillipedium spicigerum
 Chrysopogon filipes
 Cymbopogon refractus
 Dichanthium annulatum
 Dichanthium aristatum
 Dichanthium caricosum
 Dichanthium sericeum
 Heteropogon contortus
 Hyparrhenia hirta
 Pennisetum glaucum
 Sarga leiocladum
 Sarga plumosum
 Schizachyrium scoparium (Michx.) Nash = Andropogon scoparius Michx.
 Themeda triandra
 Urochloa sp.

Taxonomy 
A synonym for Claviceps pusilla Ces. is Hypocrea pusilla Ces..

References 

Clavicipitaceae